Svetoslav is a given name. Notable people with the name include:

 Svetoslav of Croatia (before 997 - 1000), king of Croatia
 Svetoslav Dyakov (born 1984), Bulgarian football midfielder
 Svetoslav Georgiev (born 1977), Bulgarian football player
 Svetoslav Minkov (1902–1966), Bulgarian writer
 Svetoslav Petrov (footballer born 1978), former Bulgarian football midfielder
 Svetoslav Petrov (footballer born 1988), Bulgarian football midfielder for Lokomotiv Sofia
 Svetoslav Stoyanov (born 1976), badminton player from France
 Svetoslav Roerich (1904–1993), Russian painter
 Svetoslav Todorov (born 1978), Bulgarian international footballer
 Svetoslav Vitkov (born 1971), Bulgarian singer

See also
 Sviatoslav

Slavic masculine given names
Bulgarian masculine given names
Russian masculine given names
Croatian masculine given names